Ocknell Plain can be found in the New Forest near Southampton, England.

The area was used in World War II for the Stoney Cross airfield and it is now very popular with campers and daytrippers. Campsites in the area include Ocknell and Longbeech. The Rufus Stone can be found about a mile east of Ocknell Plain. The nearest settlements are Stoney Cross, Minstead and Fritham.

External links

Campsites in the United Kingdom
New Forest
Outdoor structures in England